"On the Road" is a single by Canadian country music artist Dick Damron. Released in 1976, it was the second single from his album Soldier of Fortune. The song reached number one on the RPM Country Tracks chart in Canada in March 1976.

Chart performance

References

1976 singles
Dick Damron songs
1976 songs
Songs written by Dick Damron